Axel Mathias Villanueva Sandoval (born August 10, 1989) is a Nicaraguan footballer who currently plays midfield for Deportivo Walter Ferretti in the Primera División de Nicaragua.

Club career
Villanueva started his career with Walter Ferretti. He joined Panamanian side Tauro for the 2014 Clausura and signed a one-year contract despite Ferreti wanting just a loan deal.

International career
Villanueva made his debut for Nicaragua in a September 2010 friendly match against Guatemala and has, as of January 2014, earned a total of 15 caps, scoring 2 goals. He has represented his country in 2 FIFA World Cup qualification matches and played at the 2011 and 2013 Copa Centroamericana.

International goals
Scores and results list Honduras' goal tally first.

References

External links 
 

1989 births
Living people
Sportspeople from Managua
Association football midfielders
Nicaraguan men's footballers
Nicaragua international footballers
C.D. Walter Ferretti players
Tauro F.C. players
Nicaraguan expatriate footballers
Expatriate footballers in Panama
2011 Copa Centroamericana players
2013 Copa Centroamericana players